Marco Minnemann (born 24 December 1970) is a German multi-instrumentalist and composer who primarily plays drums.

Career
Minnemann has released over a dozen solo albums as drummer, multi-instrumentalist, and vocalist, and performed on over 100 studio albums with dozens of artists and groups. He has previously been a member of the German funk-metal crossover band Freaky Fukin Weirdoz and has performed and recorded with German rock band H-Blockx and Grammy-nominated English musician Steven Wilson. He is the drummer for the Mute Gods, a trio led by Nick Beggs of British new wave band Kajagoogoo, and he has performed with Joe Satriani since 2013. Minnemann appeared on the cover of the June 2007 issue of Modern Drummer, with the magazine writing that "he has been instrumental in developing the advanced concept of complex interdependence", a drum technique allowing him to play varying patterns with each of his feet and hands.

In 2006, Minnemann recorded a 51-minute live drum solo that served as the basis for his Normalizer 2 project, in which he shared the track with several musicians and asked that they each write and record their own work accompanying the composition. A number of the resulting recordings were released as duo albums, including Trey Gunn's Modulator, Alex Machacek's 24 Tales, and Mike Keneally's Evidence of Humanity.

In late 2017, Minnemann joined international prog-rock rock supergroup the Sea Within and appears on their 2018 debut. Formed by Swedish guitarist and singer-songwriter Roine Stolt, the band also features bassist Jonas Reingold, guitarist Daniel Gildenlöw, and keyboardist Tom Brislin.

Minnemann is a member of instrumental rock power trio the Aristocrats, playing alongside Guthrie Govan and Bryan Beller. In 2019, the group released their fourth studio album, You know what...?

In 2020, Minnemann and collaborator Randy McStine formed McStine & Minnemann. The duo released two albums that year: the self-titled McStine & Minnemann and McStine & Minnemann II.

Minnemann was featured as a voice actor in the second season of the Titmouse-animated series Metalocalypse. The episode, which also featured Mike Patton of Faith No More, aired on Adult Swim in 2008.

Books

 Ultimate Play Along Drum Trax
 Extreme Interdependence: Drumming Beyond Independence (with audio CD) –  (2001)
 Maximum Minnemann  (2006)

DVDs
 Extreme Drumming (2003)
 The Marco Show (2006)
 Marco Minnemann: Live in L.A. (2007)

Discography

Solo
 The Green Mindbomb (1998)
 Comfortably Homeless (1999)
 Orchids (2002)
 Broken Orange (2003)
 Normalizer (2003)
 Mieze (2004)
 Contraire de la chanson (2006)
 Housewifedogandtwokids (2007)
 A Mouth of God (2008)
 Catspoon (2009)
 Evil Smiles of Beauty/Sound of Crime (2012)
 Symbolic Fox (feat. Guthrie Govan) (2012)
 EEPS (2014)
 Celebration (2015)
 Above the Roses (2016)
 Schattenspiel (2016)
 Borrego (feat. Alex Lifeson and Joe Satriani) (2017)
 My Sister (feat. Alex Lifeson) (2019)

with Freaky Fukin Weirdoz
 Senseless Wonder (1992)
 Mao Mak Maa (1993)
 Culture Shock (1995)
 Hula (1997)

with Illegal Aliens
 Thickness (1996)
 Red Alibis (1997)
 Time (1998)
 International Telephone (2000)
 Swine Songs – Best Of (2006)

with H-Blockx
 Fly Eyes (1998)

Minnemann/Brinkmann
 Motor (2002)
 The Shining (2010)

Fabio Trentini, Marco Minneman, Mario Brinkmann
 Disarmed (2005)

Minnemann/Brinkmann/Trentini/Zimmer
 Play the Police (2007)

with UKZ
 Radiation (2009)

Normalizer 2
 Marco Minneman – Normalizer 2 (2010)
 Mike Keneally – Evidence of Humanity (2010)
 Jason Sadites – Behind the Laughter (2010)
 Trey Gunn – Modulator (2010)
 John Czajkowski – West ZooOpolis (2010)
 Mario Brinkmann – Normalizer 2 (2010)
 Alex Machacek – 24 Tales (2010)
 Phi Yaan-Zek – Dance with the Anima (2010)
 Jimmy Pitts – 2L82B Normal (2010)
 Aaron Ruimy – A Few Minor Modifications (2010)

Phi Yaan-Zek with Marco Minnemann
 Deeper with the Anima (2012)

with Shiloh Sheray
 S+M (2011)

with the Aristocrats
 The Aristocrats (2011)
 Boing, We'll Do It Live! (2012)
 Culture Clash (2013)
 Live in Osaka (2014)
 Tres Caballeros (2015)
 You Know What...? (2019)

with Matte Henderson
 The Veneer of Logic (2013)

with Tony Levin and Jordan Rudess
 Levin Minnemann Rudess (2013)
 From the Law Offices of Levin Minnemann Rudess (2016)

Pitts Minnemann Project
 The Psychic Planetarium (2016)

with the Mute Gods
 Do Nothing till You Hear from Me (2016)
 Tardigrades Will Inherit the Earth (2017)
 Atheists and Believers (2019)

with the Sea Within
 The Sea Within (2018)

with Randy McStine
 McStine and Minnemann (2020)
 McStine and Minnemann II (2020)

Selected recordings with other artists
2000s
 Paul Gilbert – Burning Organ (2000)
 Wolfgang Schmid – Special Kick (2002)
 Paddy Kelly – In Exile (2003)
 Nena – Nena feat. Nena (2002)
 Paul Gilbert – Spaceship One (2004)
 Paul Gilbert – Space Ship Live DVD (2005)
 Wolfgang Schmid – A Swift Kick (2005)
 Mario Brinkmann – Engineer (2007)
 Illogicist – The Insight Eye (2007)
 Necrophagist – Summer Slaughter Tour DVD (2008)
 Ephel Duath – Through My Dog's Eyes (2008)

2010s
 Eddie Jobson – Ultimate Zero Tour – Live (2010)
 Tony MacAlpine – Tony MacAlpine (2011)
 Paul Cusick – P'dice (2011)
 Mike Keneally/Andy Partridge – Wing Beat Fantastic (2012)
 Steven Wilson – Catalogue / Preserve / Amass (2012)
 Steven Wilson – Get All You Deserve (2012)
 Forward Shapes – Legacy (2012)
 Psyaxis – Black Dawn Rising (2012)
 Ephel Duath – On Death and Cosmos (2012)
 Steven Wilson – The Raven That Refused to Sing (And Other Stories) (2013)
 Ephel Duath – Hemmed by Light, Shaped by Darkness (2013)
 Mike Keneally – You Must Be This Tall (2013)
 Steven Wilson – Drive Home (2013)
 Nathan Frost – Synecron (2013)
 The Hushdown – Radio (2014)
 Syndone – Odysseas (2014)
 At War with Self – Circadian Rhythm Disorder (2015)
 Steven Wilson – Hand. Cannot. Erase. (2015)
 Joe Satriani – Shockwave Supernova (2015)
 Amadeus Awad – Death Is Just a Feeling (2015)
 Plini – The End of Everything (2015)
 Mike Keneally – Scambot 2 (2016)
 Steven Wilson – 4½ (2016)
 Dewa Budjana – Mahandini (2018)
 Alberto Rigoni – EvoRevolution (2019)
 Jordan Rudess – Wired for Madness (2019)

2020s
 Alberto Rigoni – Odd Times (2020)
 Alberto Rigoni – Metal Addicted (2021)
 Jess Lewis – Seafoam (2021)

References

External links
 
 

1970 births
Musicians from Hanover
Living people
German composers
German rock drummers
Male drummers
German male musicians
Necrophagist members
German expatriates in the United States
21st-century drummers
21st-century German male musicians
At War with Self members
The Aristocrats (band) members